Bang Krathum is a district (amphoe) in the Phitsanulok province, Thailand.

Etymology
Bang means 'village' or 'settlement'.  The second element krathum means 'bur-flower tree' (Neolamarckia cadamba).

Geography
Neighboring districts are (from the north clockwise), Mueang Phitsanulok and Wang Thong of Phitsanulok Province; Sak Lek, Mueang Phichit, and Sam Ngam of Phichit province. Most of Bang Krathum lies within the Nan Basin, although a narrow strip of land on the west side of the district lies within the Yom Basin. Both basins are part of the Chao Phraya Watershed. The Nan, Wang Thong and Wat Ta Yom Rivers flow through Bang Krathum, and the Yom River forms part of the border between Bang Krathum and Phichit.

History
The minor district (king amphoe) Bang Krathum was created in 1927 by combining three sub-districts from Mueang Phitsanulok District and three sub-districts from Pa Mak District, the present-day Wang Thong District. Originally a subordinate of Mueang Phitsanulok District, it was upgraded to a full district in 1946.

Administration
The district is divided into nine sub-districts (tambons), which are further subdivided into 87 mubans, which are divisions at the village level. Many villages occupy more than one muban. There are two sub-district municipalities (thesaban tambon). Bang Krathum covers parts of tambon Bang Krathum, and Noen Kum covers the tambon Noen Kum and Wat Ta Yom. There are a further seven tambon administrative organizations (TAO).

Economy
Bang Krathum's chief crops are rice, sugar cane, fruits, oranges, tamarinds, cassavas, soy beans and mung beans.

In Bang Krathum, there are a number of "banana factories" that package an assortment of dried fruits including dried bananas and tamarinds that are sold in Thailand and exported worldwide. There is also a large sugar cane production plant in the district owned by Phitsanulok Sugar Co., Ltd.

Settlements
Of the 51 villages in Bang Krathum District, those that occupy multiple mubans are as follows:
Ban Bang Krathum
Ban Dong Mee
Ban Grong Greng
Ban Kok Salud
Ban Khok Sanam
Ban Noen Kum
Ban Sam Ruen
Ban Sanam Khli
Ban Tha Makam
Ban Tha Na
Ban Tha Tan
Ban Wat Kwang
Ban Wat Ta Yom
Ban Yan Yao

Temples
There are 44 Theravada Buddhist temples in the district.  At least one, Wat Grung See Jayrin, has a historic chedi.

Attractions
 Ban Dongphayom Boat Race

Flooding
In 2006, there were reported cases of leptospirosis among residents of Bang Krathum, contracted due to standing water.

References

External links
amphoe.com

Bang Krathum